News.PH Kasama si Pia Hontiveros (or simply as News.PH) is the flagship national network Filipino-language newscast program of CNN Philippines, anchored by its Chief Correspondent Pia Hontiveros. The half-hour newscast airs at 7:00 PM on weekdays.

Initially launched as a public affairs program in 2012, it returned as a primetime Filipino language newscast in 2020, making it the first-ever Filipino-language primetime newscast of the network. The 7pm timeslot of the program was formerly occupied by 7pm edition of CNN Philippines News Night (which is anchored also by Hontiveros and it became the companion newscast of News.PH) every Mondays, Wednesdays and Fridays, as well as weekly current affairs programs Politics as Usual on Tuesdays and On The Record on Thursdays.

Overview
News.PH is similar to CNN's Amanpour. where the host interviews newsmakers on certain topics at hand, mostly the political arena. Special editions would also be produced when other extreme issues would warrant.

The former tagline of the program is This is not a politics as usual, which been an inspiration of the defunct public affairs show Politics as Usual that formerly aired every Tuesdays at 7pm.

The newscast's current tagline is "May pinagmulan, may pinupuntahan at may malalim na dahilan." (lit. There's a source, a direction and a deeper-meaning of the story).

History

As a public affairs program (2012-2017)

It was first known as a public affairs program in 2012 from the network's predecessors Solar News Channel and 9TV, which talks about political issues and current events.

Notable guests and special editions
News.PH had interviewed the likes of Sen. Grace Poe, Panfilo Lacson, Rodrigo Duterte, Vice Pres. Jejomar Binay, his son Junjun and a host of other newsmakers.

Iglesia Ni Cristo leadership crisis
After what transpired on the streets of EDSA during the INC protest, News.PH aired a special Saturday edition with former INC minister Isaias Samson being interviewed by Hontiveros on the set and spokesperson Edwil Zabala on the phone. The special ran for an hour.

AlDub
On October 28, 2015, News.PH set aside the political format to give way to News.PH: AlDub, A Social Phenomenon. Hontiveros interviewed pop culture experts and social media administrators to tackle the topic on the aftermath of the record-breaking 41M Twitter record. On the same night the Twitter hashtag #ALDUBOnCNNPH trended on the Philippines.

The episode was rebroadcast on December 30 and 31, 2015 as a special year-ender.

The First 100 Days
From July 1 to October 2016, News.PH was formatted into a weekly round-up of new President Rodrigo Duterte's first 100 days in office. Hontiveros talks to members of the administration, experts, and critics to discuss the events involving the President and his administration the week before.

Cancellation
As a part of the sweeping restructuring of CNN Philippines under Armie Jarin-Bennett, News.PH was cancelled on February 24, 2017, and its slot was replaced by Gilbert Remulla's The Political Insider a week later.

As a Filipino-language newscast (2020-2022)

On May 18, 2020, CNN Philippines aired News.PH as its first-ever nightly news program in the Filipino language, replacing the 7pm half-hour edition of News Night. Pia Hontiveros remained as anchor, and the newscast focuses on deeper meaning of the stories affecting Filipino lives.

On September 2, 2022, News.PH made its final broadcast to give way to News Night which was extended to 1 hour and was reformatted to a Filipino-language newscast.

See also
Solar Entertainment Corporation
Nine Media Corporation
Talk TV (Philippine TV network) (the former name of Solar News Channel)
CNN Philippines News and Current Affairs
Daybreak
Newsday
CNN Philippines Network News
CNN Philippines Nightly News

Philippine television news shows
CNN Philippines original programming
CNN Philippines News and Current Affairs
English-language television shows
Filipino-language television shows
2012 Philippine television series debuts
2022 Philippine television series endings
Flagship evening news shows